Gribben is a surname. Notable people with the surname include:

Alan Gribben, American literary scholar
Darren Gribben (born 1986), Scottish football player
Edward Gribben (1888-?), British military aviator
James H. Gribben (1839-1878), American soldier

See also

 Gribben Head, a promontory in the United Kingdom